The 2013 World Table Tennis Championships mixed doubles was the 52nd edition of the mixed doubles championship.  

Zhang Chao and Cao Zhen were the defending champions.
Kim Hyok-Bong and Kim Jong defeated Lee Sang-Su and Park Young-Sook 11–6, 11–8, 11–3, 6–11, 8–11, 11–7 in the final to win the title.

Seeds
Doubles matches will be best of 5 games in qualification matches and best of 7 games in the 128-player sized main draw.

  Wang Liqin /  Rao Jingwen (semifinals)
  Qiu Yike /  Wen Jia (fourth round)
  Gao Ning /  Feng Tianwei (third round)
  Chen Qi /  Hu Limei (fourth round)
  Cheung Yuk /  Jiang Huajun (semifinals)
  Kim Hyok-Bong /  Kim Jong (champions)
  Seiya Kishikawa /  Ai Fukuhara (third round)
  Seo Hyun-Deok /  Seok Ha-Jung (fourth round)
  Jiang Tianyi /  Lee Ho Ching (quarterfinals)
  Kenji Matsudaira /  Misako Wakamiya (fourth round)
  Yang Zi /  Yu Mengyu (fourth round)
  Maharu Yoshimura /  Kasumi Ishikawa (third round)
  Chen Chien-an /  Huang Yi-hua (quarterfinals)
  Cho Eon-Rae /  Yang Ha-Eun (quarterfinals)
  Tang Peng /  Ng Wing Nam (fourth round)
  Andrei Filimon /  Elizabeta Samara (second round)
  Bora Vang /  Melek Hu (quarterfinals)
  Pavel Platonaw /  Aleksandra Privalova (third round)
  Adrian Crișan /  Daniela Dodean (third round)
  Carlos Machado /  Shen Yanfei (second round)
  Ovidiu Ionescu /  Bernadette Szőcs (third round)
  Patrick Franziska /  Petrissa Solja (third round)
  Lee Sang-Su /  Park Young-Sook (final)
  Ádám Pattantyús /  Georgina Póta (second round)
  He Zhi Wen /  Sara Ramirez (third round)
  Adrien Mattenet /  Alice Abbat (third round)
  Daniel Gorak /  Natalia Partyka (second round)
  Lubomir Jančárik /  Iveta Vacenovská (third round)
  Alexander Shibaev /  Elena Troshneva (second round)
  Dmitrij Prokopcov /  Renáta Štrbíková (second round)
  Emmanuel Lebesson /  Carole Grundisch (third round)
  Cazuo Matsumoto /  Caroline Kumahara (second round)
  Chiang Hung-chieh /  Cheng I-ching (second round)
  Mihai Bobocica /  Nikoleta Stefanova (second round)
  Wu Chih-chi /  Chen Szu-yu (second round)
  Marko Jevtović /  Anamaria Erdelji (first round)
  Mikhail Paykov /  Yana Noskova (second round)
  Oleksandr Didukh /  Tetyana Bolenko (second round)
  Omar Assar /  Dina Meshref (second round)
  Mattias Karlsson /  Matilda Ekholm (second round)
  János Jakab /  Szandra Pergel (second round)
  Kou Lei /  Ganna Gaponova (second round)
  Sharath Kamal /  Shamini Kumaresan (second round)
  El-sayed Lashin /  Nadeen El-Dawlatly (second round)
  Steffen Mengel /  Sabine Winter (second round)
  Simon Gauzy /  Laura Gasnier (second round)
  Marc Duran /  Galia Dvorak (third round)
  Lubomir Pistej /  Barbora Balážová (fourth round)
  Daniel Kosiba /  Dora Madarász (third round)
  Gustavo Tsuboi /  Jessica Yamada (third round)
  Tomislav Kolarek /  Lea Rakovac (second round)
  Liam Pitchford /  Kelly Sibley (second round)
  Yevhen Pryshchepa /  Margaryta Pesotska (second round)
  Žolt Pete /  Monika Molnar (first round)
  Thiago Monteiro /  Ligia Silva (second round)
  Kim Nam-Chol /  Kim Hye-Song (second round)
  Pak Sin-Hyok /  Ri Mi-Gyong (third round)
  Alexey Liventsov /  Antonina Savelyeva (second round)
  Robert Floras /  Monika Pietkiewicz (second round)
  Marcos Madrid /  Yadira Silva (first round)
  Soumyajit Ghosh /  Mouma Das (third round)
  Amalraj Anthony /  Madhurika Patkar (second round)
  Pawel Fertikowski /  Katarzyna Grzybowska (fourth round)

Draw

Finals

Top half

Section 1

Section 2

Section 3

Section 4

Bottom half

Section 5

Section 6

Section 7

Section 8

References

External links
Main Draw

Mixed doubles